Mamiboys was a boyband consisting of Caleb Jacob, Kevi-J and Krisheno from, India and Singapore. Formed in 2007, by Krisheno, the band is composed of Krisheno (Music Producer, Songwriter and Rapper), Caleb Jacob (Songwriter and Lead Vocalist) and Kevi-J (Lead Vocalist). The boy band was active until Krisheno exited the boy band in 2021 to pursue his musical career as a solo artist.

Mamiboys have worked together with several South Indian Music Producers such as Harris Jayaraj, Srikanth Deva & Bobo Shashi for various Tamil and Telugu Movie Soundtracks.
In 2012, the group singles titled "Chalo India" and "Siru Siru Thozvikal" were featured as official soundtracks for the Award Winning Short Film Roadside Ambanis.

2009-10 : Contributions to South Indian Movies 
In the year 2009, Mamiboys made their debut in South Indian Film Music by contributing rap vocals in the song "Seema Siriki" from the South Indian Movie "Thottu Paar". Composed by Indian Music Producer, Srikanth Deva and directed by K. V. Nandhu and produced by Janaki Sivakumar and starring Vidharth, Ramana and Lakshana in leading roles the movie was released on 15 October 2010 with a U/A Certification. On the same year, Mamiboys collaborated with South-Indian Music Producer Bobo Shashi to contribute rap vocals for the song titled “Bindaas” from the Telugu Motion Picture "Bindaas" Starring film stars Manoj Manchu and Sheena Shahabadi, Bindaas was released in India on 5 February 2010 and was also later dubbed in Malayalam as "Happy 2 Happy". In 2010, the group contributed rap vocals to South Indian Music Producer Harris Jayaraj composition which was featured as a background score for the Telugu Motion Picture titled "Orange" starring film stars,  Ram Charan and Genelia D Souza. The film was released in India on 26 November 2010 and was later dubbed in Malayalam as "Hai Ram Charan" and in Tamil as "Ram Charan".

2012 : Roadside Ambanis
In 2012, Mamiboys duo singles titled Chalo India and Siru Siru Thozvikal were featured as official soundtracks for the Short Film "Roadside Ambanis". Written and directed by first-timer Kamal Sethu, and produced by Grape Pictures, Roadside Ambanis was awarded as the Best Short Film at the 3rd Norway Tamil Film Festival On 27 April 2012. Oslo, Norway.

2013: Dum Tea

Dum Tea is the debut music album of Mamiboys with music scored by Jude Niranjan. Consisting of Seven Tracks, the album launch event took place at AVM Studios on May 13, 2013. Dum Tea consists of a total of seven songs.

Controversy

In 2015, Mamiboys accused debutant South Indian director, Thangam Saravanan of having copied their Dum Tea song concept as well as visuals from Dum Tea official music video for a song titled “Tea Podu” in his debut movie “Anjala” starring Vimal and Nandita.

However director Thangam Saravanan refused the allegation stating that 'Tea' was the only similarity between the two songs and the concept, music, lyrics, choreography and making were entirely different.

2016 : KAKAL

"KAKAL" is a song recorded by Mamiboys Caleb Jacob and was released on April 1, 2016. The music of KAKAL was produced by Mamiboys Krisheno and written by Caleb Jacob. Kakal was described as being different and fresh with the music being described as addictive.

2021 : Take Me Somewhere

"Take Me Somewhere" is a Chill EDM track produced by Mamiboys Krisheno and was released on June 1, 2021. The track was described as being different from the usual EDM genre consisting of screaming drops, grinding basslines, over the top rave synths and crowd driven anthem. Instead the song was described more of a chilled out, super ambient record with an overall summer vibe.

Discography

South Indian Films

Short films

Singles

References

Indian hip hop groups